Rečica may refer to:

Bosnia and Herzegovina
Rečica, Bosnia and Herzegovnina, Novi Grad Municipality, Sarajevo
Rečica (Han Pijesak), a village in the Republika Srpska

Croatia
 Rečica, Croatia, a village east of Karlovac
 Rečica Kriška

Italy
Fiumicello, or Rečica in Slovene commune

North Macedonia
 Rečica, Kumanovo, Kumanovo Municipality
 Golema Rečica, Tetovo Municipality

Serbia
 Rečica, Bojnik
 Rečica (Kladovo), a village in the municipality of Kladovo
 Rečica, Požarevac
 Rečica (Žitorađa), a village in the municipality of Žitorađa

Slovenia
 Rečica, Ilirska Bistrica, a settlement next to Ilirska Bistrica
 Rečica ob Paki
 Rečica ob Savinji, a municipality in the Lower Styria region